Joseph Patrick Courtney (November 23, 1884 – June 2, 1922) was an American football player, coach, and official. He served as the head football coach at Boston College in 1911 and Norwich University in 1915, compiling a career college football coaching record of 0–15.

Biography
A native of Worcester, Massachusetts, Courtney played football for the College of the Holy Cross, Villanova University, and Lafayette College. His cousin, Joseph A. Courtney, was also a noted athlete at the same time as Courtney and was the captain of the Georgetown baseball team at the time of his death in 1909. Courtney began his coaching career in 1909 at the Boys High School in Brooklyn. Courtney later coached at Boston College, the University of New Hampshire, Stone School, Dartmouth College, Norwich University, Montclair High School, and the Orange A. A. and was a football and basketball official for high school and college football games. During World War I, Courtney served with the 4th United States Aero Squadron in France and single-handedly took down two enemy aircraft. He was wounded in action. After the war, Courtney was an Internal Revenue Service agent attached to the real estate tax division in New Haven, Connecticut. In 1919 he moved to Bloomfield, New Jersey, where his mother and sister lived.

On June 2, 1922, a train engineer reported that he believed he had passed over a body on the tracks near the Westport Station in Westport, Connecticut. A railroad police officer was dispatched to Westport, where he discovered Courtney's badly mutilated body. The night prior, Coutrney had been seen arguing with a group of foreigners. The undertaker found two small puncture marks behind Courtney's left ear, however the death was ruled an accident. Courtney was buried at St. John's Cemetery in Worcester.

Head coaching record

College football

References

External links
 

1884 births
1922 deaths
American football ends
American football halfbacks
Basketball referees in the United States
College football officials
Boston College Eagles football coaches
Holy Cross Crusaders football players
Norwich Cadets football coaches
Lafayette Leopards football players
Villanova Wildcats football players
High school baseball coaches in the United States
High school football coaches in New Jersey
High school football coaches in New York (state)
Internal Revenue Service people
United States Army Air Service pilots of World War I
People from Bloomfield, New Jersey
Coaches of American football from Massachusetts
Players of American football from Worcester, Massachusetts
Accidental deaths in Connecticut
Military personnel from New Jersey